Cassidy Sage Lehrman is an American actress. She is best known for her recurring role as Sarah Gold in the HBO television series Entourage.

Filmography

References

External links 
 

Living people
American film actresses
American television actresses
Actresses from Washington (state)
American child actresses
21st-century American actresses
Year of birth missing (living people)